A cascade effect is an inevitable and sometimes unforeseen chain of events due to an act affecting a system. If there is a possibility that the cascade effect will have a negative impact on the system, it is possible to analyze the effects with a consequence / impact analysis. Cascade effects are commonly visualised in tree structures, also called event trees.

In aeronautics
Cascade effects seen in the perspective of space travelling are theoretical possibilities that "space junk" or a satellite destroyed by a meteor will send debris throughout the orbits of most telecommunication satellites destroying them in the process and subsequently sending that debris into all possible orbits, destroying everything in orbit around the Earth, known as the Kessler syndrome. It is theorized that if this occurs, space flight beyond Earth will become very difficult if not impossible.

In medicine

In biology, according to Mold and Stein, the term cascade refers to "a process that, once started, proceeds stepwise to its full, seemingly inevitable, conclusion". The main cause of a cascade of injury in medicine is by misdiagnosis and medical error. These result in iatrogenic injury and from medical error flows a cascade of effects and results often including pain, disability, loss of job, poverty and homelessness which obviously cause mental health problems and may cause death. In medicine, a cascade effect may also refer to a chain of events initiated by an unnecessary test, an unexpected result, or patient or physician anxiety, which results in ill-advised tests or treatments that may cause harm to patients as the results are pursued.  An example would be ordering a full body CT scan without a clear reason, finding an incidentaloma and undergoing a debilitating surgery to remove it, despite the fact that the condition was asymptomatic and possibly benign.

In ecology
There is also an ecological definition of cascade effects, in which the death of one key species in an ecosystem triggers the extinction of other species.

In disaster risk reduction and emergency planning

The figure above illustrates the differences between: (a) linear paths of chain -effects, and (b) complex paths of cascades. In "cascading disasters," secondary emergencies escalate and become the centre of a crisis, challenging the coordination of emergency relief and long-term recovery.

The different levels of cascading effects that are present in complex events suggest a differentiation between cascading effects and Cascading disasters have been defined as:

See also

 Adverse drug reaction
 Adverse effect (medicine)
 Bedsore
 Bioethics
 Classification of Pharmaco-Therapeutic Referrals 
 Complication (medicine)
 Cumulative effect
 Iatrogenesis
 Kessler syndrome
 Medical error
 Nocebo
 Patient safety
 Placebo
 Polypharmacy
 Quaternary prevention
 Medical harm

References

Spaceflight
Medical ethics
Health care quality
Medical error